Mihashin Furaana Dhandhen is a 2012 Maldivian romantic drama film directed by Ravee Farooq. Produced by Fathimath Nahula under Crystal Entertainment, the film stars Niuma Mohamed, Mohamed Manik and Ali Seezan in pivotal roles. The film was released on 28 February 2012.

Cast 
 Niuma Mohamed as Saara
 Ali Seezan as Shiyaz
 Mohamed Manik as Amir
 Roanu Hassan Manik as Hassan
 Ahmed Nimal as Asim
 Mariyam Shakeela as Wadheefa

Soundtrack

Release and reception
Upon release, the film received mixed response from critics. Ahmed Nadheem of Haveeru noted the film as "the best Maldivian melodramatic film" he had seen in the past two years. Impressed with the performance of actors, cinematography and back music, Nadheem was displeased with  he plot of film for having resemblance to Subhash Ghai's musical romantic drama film Taal (1999) and Sanjay Leela Bhansali-directed Hum Dil De Chuke Sanam of the same genre and released in the same year.

Accolades

References

2012 films
2012 romantic drama films
Maldivian romantic drama films
Films directed by Ravee Farooq